Tim Fehlbaum (born 1982 in Basel) is a Swiss film director.

Career
Fehlbaum studied directing from 2002-2009 at the University of Television and Film Munich. While there, he made several short films, music videos and worked as camera operator on documentary films.

In 2011 Fehlbaum made his feature film debut with the bleak post-apocalyptic horror film Hell, for which he also co-wrote the screenplay. The film starred Hannah Herzsprung, Angela Winkler and Lars Eidinger in the lead roles. It has received numerous good reviews, especially for Fehlbaums ability to create a visually bright but atmospherically dark thriller with dense atmosphere. 
Fehlbaum  won the German Cinema New Talent Award at the Munich Film Festival, where it had its world premiere and the Zurich Film Award both in the director category. In 2012 the film was nominated in six categories and won Best Music at the German Film Awards and two awards at the Swiss Film Award. It also appeared in competition at the Locarno International Film Festival and won awards at genre festivals such as the Sitges Film Festival and Fantasporto.

Fehlbaum also won the German New Faces Award in 2012 and was listet in Variety's 10 Euro directors to watch.

In 2021 Fehlbaum's science-fiction thriller film Tides premiered at the Berlin International Film Festival in the Berlinale Special section and subsequently won several awards, such as four German Film Awards, as well as two Bavarian Film Awards for Best Director and Best Cinematography. Tides won the RTS Audience Award and the Best Production Design Award at the 20th edition of the NIFFF. and Best Feature Film and Best Visual Effects at the Fancine Fantastic Film Festival in Malaga.
Reviews noted Fehlbaum's flair for striking mise en scene.

Filmography 
 2004: For Julian (short film)
 2006: On Flaucher (short film)
 2006: Where's Freddy? (short film)
 2011: Hell
 2021: Tides

Awards 
 2004: Shocking Shorts Award for For Julian
 2011: German Cinema New Talent Award for Hell
 2011: Zurich Film Award in the director category for Hell
 2012: New Faces Award in the debut film category for Hell
 2020: Bavarian Film Award in the director category for Tides

References

External links 
 
 Profile on filmportal.de
 interview at popkulturschock.de
 Video Portrait in internetTV.ch

Swiss film directors
1982 births
Living people